Darak Kings Figueroa (born August 6, 2001), professionally known as StaySolidRocky, is an American rapper, singer, and songwriter. Born in Richmond, Virginia he was lived in San Antonio, Texas for a few years then moved back to his hometown. He rose to fame in 2020 with his single "Party Girl", which peaked at number 21 on the Billboard Hot 100.

Early life
Figueroa was born in Richmond, Virginia . His father is of Puerto Rican descent. He was raised by his mother, a former rapper herself. He started expressing an interest in music when he moved in with his father. He attended high school in native or Richmond, he began free styling and started using his Instagram platform to share snippets of music he had been working on. He soon began building a fanbase on Instagram.

Career
Figueroa started to gain popularity after he released the music video for his single "Party Girl" in December 2019. The track sat at 2 million views on YouTube before it went viral on the video-sharing platform TikTok, which propelled Figueroa to stardom. He got involved with Solomon Sobande, the former manager of XXXTentacion, and shortly afterwards, he signed a deal with Columbia Records. His debut EP, Fallin' was released on July 17, 2020. The 7-track EP included "Party Girl".

Influences
Growing up, StaySolidRocky would listen to veteran hip hop artists Bone Thugs-n-Harmony and Lil Wayne. As he started making his own music, he began listening to NBA YoungBoy, Kevin Gates and Kodak Black.

Discography

Extended plays

Singles

References

Living people
African-American male rappers
American rappers
Columbia Records artists
21st-century American rappers
Rappers from Virginia
Rappers from Texas
2001 births
21st-century American male musicians
21st-century African-American musicians